2013–14 Deodhar Trophy was the 41st season of the Deodhar Trophy, a List A cricket tournament contested by 5 zonal teams of India: Central Zone, East Zone, North Zone, South Zone and West Zone.

Schedule
The 2013–14 Deodhar Trophy consisted of four matches played between the teams, where the two teams that performed the worst in the 2012–13 season of the Deodhar Trophy, East Zone and Central Zone, had to play each other in an additional knockout game to progress to the semifinals.

The schedule:
 1. 23 March - Quarterfinal - Central Zone vs East Zone
 2. 24 March - Semifinal1 - North Zone vs South Zone
 3. 25 March - Semifinal2 - West Zone vs Winner Quarterfinal
 4. 27 March - Final - Winner Semifinal1 vs Winner Semifinal2

Squads

Results

Quarterfinal

Semifinal 1

Semifinal 2

Final

References

External links
Cricinfo page

Deodhar Trophy
Deodhar Trophy
Deodhar Trophy